The orange-winged pytilia (Pytilia afra), also known as the golden-backed pytilia, is a species of estrildid finch found in Africa. It has a wide range and the International Union for Conservation of Nature has assessed it as being of least concern.

Taxonomy
This species was described as Fringilla afra by J. F. Gmelin in 1789. It is monotypic.

Description
The male's forehead, face and chin are red, and its crown and nape are grey. Its back is green, with an olive tinge. Its greater coverts are orange, and its primary coverts and flight feathers are blackish-brown, with orange edges. Its rump is crimson. The outer webs of its tail are red, and the inner webs are brown. Its throat and upper breast are pale grey, and its breast is olive. There are off-white bars on its breast and belly. Its legs are pale pink or pinkish-brown. Its eyes are orange or red, and its beak is red. The female has a greyish head, with no red. Its back and wings are duller than the male, and the bars on its underparts are broader. The immature bird is like the female, but is drabber.

Distribution and habitat
This pytilia is found in Angola, Botswana, Burundi, the Republic of Congo, the Democratic Republic of the Congo, Ethiopia, Kenya, Malawi, Mozambique, Rwanda, South Africa, South Sudan, Tanzania, Uganda, Zambia and Zimbabwe. Its habitat is edges of forests, miombo woodland and wooded grasslands, usually in moist areas.

Behaviour and ecology
The orange-winged pytilia is found in small flocks, and can form larger, looser flocks when it is not breeding. It feeds on the ground, eating seeds and probably also insects. In the non-breeding season, it can move great distances to find food. Its call is seee, and its song is quickly repeated whistles. The orange-winged pytilia is parasitised by the broad-tailed paradise whydah, which mimics its call. The orange-winged pytilia's breeding season is April to May in the southeastern Congo Basin, January to May in Zambia and Zimbabwe, March to June in Malawi, and April to June in Tanzania. The pytilia's incubation period is 12 to 13 days, and the nestling period is 21 days.

Status
Because the species has a large range and a stable population trend, the IUCN has classified the species as being of least concern. It may be captured and used as caged birds.

References

External links
BirdLife International species factsheet

orange-winged pytilia
Birds of Sub-Saharan Africa
Birds of Southern Africa
orange-winged pytilia
orange-winged pytilia